The second season of the American version of the reality television show Ex on the Beach, premiered on MTV on Thursday, December 20, 2018. It featured cast members from various reality television shows living together in California with their ex-partners.

Cast

Cast duration

Table key
 = The cast member is featured in this episode
 = The cast member arrives on the beach
 = The cast member has an ex arrive on the beach
 = The cast member arrives on the beach and has an ex arrive during the same episode
 = The cast member leaves the beach
 = The cast member arrives on the beach and leaves during the same episode
 = The cast member does not feature in this episode

Notes

Episodes

References

External links
Official website

Ex on the Beach
2018 American television seasons
2019 American television seasons